In economics, the absolute income hypothesis concerns how a consumer divides their disposable income between consumption and saving. It is part of the theory of consumption proposed by economist John Maynard Keynes. The hypothesis was subject to further research in the 1960s and 70s, most notably by American economist James Tobin (1918–2002).

Background
Keynes' General Theory in 1936 identified the relationship between income and consumption as a key macroeconomic relationship. Keynes asserted that real consumption (ie adjusted for inflation) is a function of real disposable income, which is total income net of taxes. As income rises, the theory asserts, consumption will also rise but not necessarily at the same rate. When applied to a cross section of a population, rich people are expected to consume a lower proportion of their income than poor people.

The marginal propensity to consume is present in Keynes' consumption theory and determines by what amount consumption will change in response to a change in income. 

While this theory has success modeling consumption in the short term, attempts to apply this model over a longer time frame have proven less successful. This has led to the absolute income hypothesis falling out of favor as the consumption model of choice for economists. KEYNES' consumption function has come to be known 'absolute income hypothesis ' or theory. His statement of the relationship between  income and consumption was based on the fundamental psychological law.

Model
The model is

where: 
 is consumption at time t,
 is autonomous consumption, a constant,
 is the marginal propensity to consume,
 is disposable income at time t.

See also 
 Consumption function

Notes

References
 Keynes, John M. The General Theory of Employment, Interest and Money.  London: Macmillan, 1936. 

Keynesian economics